Banco Itaú Unibanco S.A. is a Brazilian financial services company headquartered in São Paulo, Brazil. 
Itaú Unibanco was formed through the merger of Banco Itaú and Unibanco in 2008. It is the largest banking institution in Brazil, as well as the largest in Latin America, and the seventy-first largest bank in the world. The bank is listed at the B3 in São Paulo and in NYSE in New York.

Itaú Unibanco has operations in Argentina, Brazil, Chile, Colombia, Panama, Paraguay, United States and Uruguay in the Americas, as well as in Luxembourg, Portugal, Switzerland and the United Kingdom in Europe; China, Hong Kong, Japan and United Arab Emirates in Asia. It has over 33,000 service points globally, of which 4,335 branches in Brazil, and around 45,000 ATMs and 55 million customers globally.

Itaúsa, a large Brazilian conglomerate ranking among Fortune magazine's top 500 corporations in the world, serve as its parent company. Outside Brazil, Itaú Unibanco has offices in Asuncion, Buenos Aires, Cayman Islands, Dubai, Hong Kong, Lisbon, London, Luxembourg, Montevideo, Nassau, New York City, Miami, Santiago, Shanghai, Tokyo and Zurich.

In 2022, the bank it was considered the most valuable brand of Brasil.

History 
In 2014 Banco Itaú announced that it was merging with Chilean bank Corpbanca. As a result of this merger, Itaú bought Helm Bank, Corpbanca's operation in Colombia and Panama, and rebranded it under the Itaú name: the branches of Helm Bank in Colombia and Panama began trading as Itaú on May 22, 2017.

In June 2013, the bank agreed to buy Citibank Uruguay's retail banking operations. 

On August 22, 2009, Banco Itaú Unibanco and insurance company Porto Seguro disclosed that they had entered into an alliance. The alliance aims to combine their residential and automobile insurance operations and includes an Operating Agreement under which the alliance will have exclusive access to offer and distribute homeowner and vehicle insurance products to clients of Banco Itaú Unibanco's branch network in Brazil and Uruguay.

On November 4, 2008, Banco Itaú and Unibanco announced the merger that resulted in Banco Itaú Unibanco. The institution was born with R$575 billion in assets, a net equity of around R$51.7 billion and a portfolio of combined credit of R$225.3 billion. The new bank had 4,800 branches and service branches, representing 18% of the country's banking network, and 14.5 million account holders (18% of the market). In terms of credit volume, it represented 19% of the Brazilian system and in total deposits, funds and managed portfolios, 21% by 2008. In the insurance and pension plan market, the new group had a 17% and 24% share, respectively. The wholesale operations (corporate) totaled more than R$65 billion, serving more than 2,000 economic groups in Brazil. The private banking (wealth management) business had become the largest in Latin America, with approximately R$90 billion in assets under management.

In September 2006, Banco Itaú bought the BankBoston assets in Brazil, Chile and Uruguay.

References

External links
Itaú International Global Website

 
Banks established in 2008
Companies based in São Paulo
Companies listed on B3 (stock exchange)